Opossum Branch is a stream in Montgomery County in the U.S. state of Missouri. It is a tributary of Elkhorn Creek.

Opossum Branch was so named on account of opossums in the area.

See also
List of rivers of Missouri

References

Rivers of Montgomery County, Missouri
Rivers of Missouri